Concert Classics is a live album by English band Strawbs.

Track listing

"The Last Resort" (Dave Cousins, Dave Lambert, Chas Cronk)
"Ghosts" (Cousins)
"Sweet Dreams"
"Night Light"
"Guardian Angel"
"Night Light"
"No Return" (Cousins, Lambert)
"Heartbreaker" (Lambert)
"Simple Visions" (Cousins, Cronk)
"Cut Like a Diamond" (Cousins, Cronk)
"Out in the Cold/Round and Round" (Cousins)
"Hero and Heroine" (Cousins)

Personnel
Dave Cousins – vocals, acoustic guitar
Dave Lambert – vocals, electric guitar
Chas Cronk – bass guitar, acoustic guitar, vocals
Tony Fernandez – drums
Andy Richards – keyboards

Release history

References

Concert Classics on Strawbsweb

1999 live albums
Strawbs live albums